DID Super Moms 3 is the third season of the Indian Hindi-language dance reality television series DID Super Moms. It premiered on 2 July 2022 on Zee TV. Hosted by Jay Bhanushali. This season Judged by Remo D'Souza, Bhagyashree and Urmila Matondkar.  The Grand Finale was aired on 25 September 2022 and winner was Varsha Bumra.

Production
Season 3 began premiering on 2 July 2022 as scheduled. On 25 May 2022 a promo was released on Zee TV official social media platforms. This show provided a platform to prove their mettle, and witness the stories and the resolution of the Super Moms to showcase their talent. The show is hosted and presented by Jay Bhanushali.

Super Gurus 

 Anuradha Iyengar
 Ashish Patil
 Bharat Ghare
 Bhawana Khanduja
 Kumar Sharma
 Shayam Yadav
 Shweta Warrier
 Roza Rana
 Rutuja Junarkar
 Vaibhav Gughe
 Vartika Jha
 Vivek Chechare

Top 12 Super Moms

Guest

See also
Dance India Dance
Dance Plus

References

External links 

 DID Super Moms 3 on ZEE5

Indian dance television shows
2022 Indian television seasons
Indian reality television series
Hindi-language television shows
Television shows set in Mumbai
Zee TV original programming